Belgium sent a delegation of 21 athletes (20 male, 1 female) to compete at the 2008 Summer Paralympics in Beijing. The nominated athletes are listed below with their individual classification and disciplines.

Belgium's overall result of just one bronze medal was its poorest ever at the Summer Paralympics. Its rank of 69th on the medal table was a sharp decline from four years earlier, where 3 gold medals, 2 silver and 2 bronze had placed it 36th. The 2008 Games were the first since 1968 at which Belgium failed to win at least one gold medal.

Medallists

The country won one medal, a bronze.

Athletics

3 competitors:

Men

Pentathlon

Cycling

2 competitors:

Men
Time trials & Road races

Pursuits

Equestrian

2 competitors:

Individual

Goalball

6 competitors:

Men
 Youssef Bihi (B3)
 Vincent Buisseret (B2)
 Bruno Vanhofe (B2)
 Johan de Rick (B2)
 Peter van Hout (B2)
 Danny van Eenooghe (B2)

Preliminary round - Group A

Group table

9th place match

Swimming

2 competitors:

Men

Table Tennis

3 competitors:

Men

Dimitri Ghion, who had been nominated as a Singles player in the TT4 category, had to withdraw his start due to injury.

Wheelchair Tennis

2 competitors:

Men

Women

See also
2008 Summer Paralympics
Belgium at the Paralympics
Belgium at the 2008 Summer Olympics

References

External links
Beijing 2008 Paralympic Games Official Site
International Paralympic Committee

Nations at the 2008 Summer Paralympics
2008
Paralympics